Elections to the Tripura Tribal Areas Autonomous District Council (TTAADC) were held on 30 April and 3 May 2000. The results were declared on 6 May 2000.

The election result was a victory for the Indigenous People's Front of Tripura (IPFT). The IPFT won 18 seats that were up for election. The Communist Party of India (Marxist) was the second largest party with 8 seats.

See also
 2021 Tripura Tribal Areas Autonomous District Council election
 2015 Tripura Tribal Areas Autonomous District Council election
 2010 Tripura Tribal Areas Autonomous District Council election
 2005 Tripura Tribal Areas Autonomous District Council election

References

2000 elections in India
Elections in Tripura
History of Tripura (1947–present)
Autonomous district council elections in India
Local elections in Tripura